Home from the Hill is a phrase from Robert Louis Stevenson's poem (and epitaph), Requiem, the last two lines of which read:
Home is the sailor, home from sea,
And the hunter home from the hill.

As a title, it may refer to:

 Home from the Hill (novel), the first novel by author William Humphrey, published in 1958
 Home from the Hill (film), a 1960 film directed by Vincente Minnelli, based on the book
 Home from the Hill  (Hook book), an autobiographical account of life in colonial Africa by Hilary Hook
 Home from the Hill (documentary), a 1980s BBC documentary based on the book
 "Home from the Hill" is the title of an unreleased song from The Kingston Trio's album Sold Out